CD Marianao Poblet is a Spanish football club located in Sant Boi de Llobregat, Barcelona, Spain. It currently plays in Preferent Territorial de Catalunya. The team's colors are red and black.

External links
Official website

Football clubs in Catalonia
Association football clubs established in 1995
1995 establishments in Spain
Sant Boi de Llobregat